Not for Beginners is the sixth solo album by Ronnie Wood.

Track listing 
All tracks composed by Ronnie Wood; except where indicated

 "Wayside" – 2:37
 "Rock 'n Roll Star" (Chris Hillman, Roger McGuinn) – 3:24
 "Whadd'ya Think" – 2:57
 "This Little Heart" – 3:39
 "Leaving Here" (Eddie Holland, Lamont Dozier, Brian Holland) – 3:19
 "Hypershine" – 3:37
 "R U Behaving Yourself?" – 3:24
 "Be Beautiful" – 3:17
 "Wake Up You Beauty" – 3:19
 "Interfere" – 4:39
 "Real Hard Rocker" – 3:08
 "Heart, Soul and Body" – 3:24
 "King of Kings" (Bob Dylan) – 3:36

Personnel 

Ronnie Wood – vocals, guitar, producer
Mark Wells – guitar, bass, drums, vocals, producer
Bob Dylan – guitar on "Interfere" & "King of Kings"
Scotty Moore – guitar on "Interfere"
Jesse Wood – guitar
Willie Weeks – bass
Ian Jenning – double bass on "Interfere"
Mick Jones – guitar, keyboards, director
Ian McLagan – piano on "Interfere"
D.J. Fontana – drums on "Interfere"
Andy Newmark – drums
Martin Wright – drums, percussion, vocals, producer
Kelly Jones – vocals
Leah Wood – vocals

References

Ronnie Wood albums
2001 albums